KWIQ may refer to:

 KWIQ-FM, a radio station (100.5 FM) licensed to Moses Lake, Washington, United States
 KWIQ (AM), a radio station (1020 AM) licensed to Moses Lake North, Washington, United States